The men's 90 kilograms (Middleweight) competition at the 2002 Asian Games in Busan was held on 1 October at the Gudeok Gymnasium.

Schedule
All times are Korea Standard Time (UTC+09:00)

Results
Legend
WO — Won by walkover

Main bracket

Repechage

References
2002 Asian Games Report, Page 460

External links
Official website

M90
Judo at the Asian Games Men's Middleweight